Rinus van den Bosch (January 10, 1938 – 14 April 1996) was a Dutch artist, who worked as sculptor, photographer, installation artist, painter, and draftsman.

Life and work 
Born in The Hague, van den Bosch was educated at the Royal Academy of Art, The Hague from 1954 to 1960.  

Van den Bosch settled as independent artist in The Hague in 1970. He was lecturer at the Academie voor Beeldende Kunsten St Joost in Breda until 1988. In 1982 he was appointed as teacher at the Willem de Kooning Academy in 1982. In 2009 Museum Boijmans Van Beuningen held a retrospective exhibition of his work. 

The artist showed the world and the people in it through line drawings, ranging from the figurative to the abstract, most with poetic titles. In these drawings, created with a sure touch and economy of line, he captured topical events and the atmosphere of The Hague as it was in the 1970s. Simplicity, colour and humour are characteristics of his paintings.  wrote in 2009 a biographic essay called Flarden van een stem. Rinus van den Bosch was in a relationship with Dutch portrait painter Marike Bok.

References

External links 
 
 Eidenai - Rinus van den Bosch at cornetsdegroot.com.

1938 births
1996 deaths
Dutch artists
Artists from The Hague
Minimalist artists
Academic staff of Willem de Kooning Academy
20th-century Dutch architects
Photographers from The Hague